Leveillula is a genus of fungi in the family Erysiphaceae.

References

Leotiomycetes